Carina Alicia Reyes Baltrip (born 1 July 1998), known as Carina Baltrip-Reyes, is an American-born Panamanian footballer who plays as a defender or a midfielder for the Panama women's national team.

Early life
Baltrip-Reyes was born in Austin, Texas and raised in Pflugerville, Texas to a Panamanian father and an African-American mother.

High school and college career
Baltrip-Reyes has attended the Hendrickson High School in Pflugerville, Texas, the Florida International University in Miami, Florida and the University of Florida in Gainesville, Florida.

Club career
Baltrip-Reyes has played for Spartak Subotica in Serbia.

International career
Baltrip-Reyes made her senior debut for Panama on 21 October 2021 in friendly away draw against Trinidad and Tobago.

International goals
Scores and results list Panama goal tally first

See also
 List of Panama women's international footballers

References

External links

1998 births
Living people
People with acquired Panamanian citizenship
Panamanian women's footballers
Women's association football defenders
Women's association football midfielders
ŽFK Spartak Subotica players
Panama women's international footballers
Panamanian expatriate women's footballers
Panamanian expatriate sportspeople in Serbia
Expatriate women's footballers in Serbia
Panamanian people of American descent
Soccer players from Austin, Texas
People from Round Rock, Texas
American women's soccer players
FIU Panthers women's soccer players
Florida Gators women's soccer players
American expatriate women's soccer players
American expatriate sportspeople in Serbia
American sportspeople of Panamanian descent
African-American women's soccer players